Postplatyptilia uruguayensis is a moth of the family Pterophoridae. It is known from Uruguay.

The wingspan is about 18 mm. Adults are on wing in March.

Etymology
The species is named after the country in which it was discovered.

References

uruguayensis
Moths described in 2006